The 2015–16 season of the Bremen-Liga, the highest association football league in the German state of Bremen, was the eighth season of the league at tier five (V) of the German football league system.

The season began on 29 August 2015 and finished on 22 May 2016, interrupted by a winter break from 19 December to 31 January.

2015–16 standings 										
The 2015–16 season saw two new clubs in the league, Bremer TS Neustadt and ESC Geestemünde, both promoted from the Landesliga Bremen.						

Of the Bremen-Liga teams only Bremer SV and Blumenthaler SV applied for a Regionalliga licence for the 2016–17 season, with the Northern German Football Association deciding on 9 May 2016 to grant all applicants a licence.

Top goalscorers
The top goal scorers for the season:

Promotion play-off
Promotion play-off were to be held at the end of the season to the Regionalliga Nord. The runners-up of the Niedersachsenliga and the champions or, in Hamburg's case, the only team applying for a licence, of the Bremen-Liga, Oberliga Hamburg and Schleswig-Holstein-Liga played each other for two more spot in the Regionalliga. In the promotion round each team met the other just once with the two highest-placed teams in the final table promoted:

References

External links 
 Bremen-Liga on Fupa.net 

Bremen-Liga
Bremen